Ishku, also rendered as Ayshakhku or Ishekuh or Ishkuh may refer to:
 Ishku-ye Bala
 Ishku-ye Pain